Elfie Shiosaki is a Noongar and Yawuru poet and academic based in Perth, Western Australia.

Her debut book Homecoming won the 2022 Western Australian Book Award for an emerging writer. It was also shortlisted in the 2022 ALS Gold Medal, Stella Prize, John Bray Poetry Award,  and received highly commended in the Victorian Premier's Literary Awards. In 2021 it was shortlisted in the Queensland Literary Awards and in 2022 for the Prime Minister's Literary Award for poetry.

Shiosaki holds a doctorate in Human Rights Education from Curtin University and is a lecturer in the School of Indigenous studies at the University of Western Australia.

Her surname comes from a Japanese ancestor who was a pearl diver in Broome.

References 

Year of birth missing (living people)
Living people

People from Western Australia
Indigenous Australian writers
21st-century Australian women writers